Suji ka Halwa  is a type of halvah made by toasting semolina (called सूजी, suji, sooji or  रवा, rawa in India) in a fat like ghee or oil, and adding a sweetener like sugar syrup or honey. It can be served for breakfast or as a dessert item. The basic recipe is made with just semolina, sugar or honey, ghee, and sometimes milk. Variations on this include dried or fresh fruits, nuts, shredded coconut, and other toppings.

History

In Medieval Arabic cuisine semolina halvah was made by roasting the milled wheat in butter and adding honey or sugar syrup to moisten the dessert. One recipe for hulwa a'jamiyya is made by boiling honey to create the syrup (diluted with water if needed) and garnished with pistachio and poppyseed.  Milk can be added, as well as toppings like almonds, pistachios and pine nuts. Ibn Sayyar al-Warraq's 10th-century cookbook includes varieties made with carrots, apple and dates. According to some scholars, this dish was introduced to India by the Mughals, but it is already listed as shali-anna, present-day Kesari bat, in Manasollasa, a 12th-century work by a south Indian Chalukyan king, Someshvara III.

In 14th-century Spain, semolina was cooked with almond milk, oil and optionally saffron for coloring. In India, sheera is made from semolina, ghee, and sugar; cardamom and milk, almonds and cashew-nuts are added.

Terminology

In Marathi, the halwa made with semolina is called rawa sheera (रवा शीरा). When the similar halwa is prepared with wheat flour it's called gavhacya pithaca sheera (गव्हाच्या पीठाचा शीरा).

In Hindi, it is sooji ka halwa (सूजी का हलवा).

In south India, the dish is currently called Kesari Bat.

In Myanmar (Burma), the dish is called sanwin makin.

In the Caribbean, it is known by Indo-Caribbeans as Mohan bhog or simply just as parsad, as it is a common sweet that Hindu Indo-Caribbeans charhaway or offer as prasad in pujas. It is called Sajjige in parts of Tulunadu.

See also
 Kesari bhath

References

Vegetarian dishes of India
Indian desserts
South Indian cuisine
Halva